Hypocrita rubrifascia is a moth species of the family Erebidae. It was described by Hering in 1925. It is found in Brazil and French Guiana.

References

Hypocrita
Moths described in 1925